City of Palms Park is a baseball stadium in Fort Myers, Florida. It served as the spring training home of the Boston Red Sox of Major League Baseball (MLB) from its opening in 1993 to 2011. It has hosted college baseball games for Florida SouthWestern State College since 2014. The stadium's name is taken from the city's official nickname.

History

City of Palms Park was built in 1992 to be the spring training home of the Boston Red Sox. It has a seating capacity of 8,000 people. It was also the home of the Red Sox' Rookie-level team in Minor League Baseball, the Gulf Coast League Red Sox, who played a season lasting from June through August each year.

Player Development Complex
The Player Development Complex is where the Red Sox trained and practiced before the exhibition season began at City of Palms. It also housed all the Minor League Baseball affiliates and coaches the entire month of March, and it is where players were reassigned as they trimmed the roster down during spring training. Once spring training ended, extended spring training ran from April through the beginning of the Gulf Coast League season. Instructional league took place there from September to October.

This complex includes five baseball fields with bullpens and eight batting tunnels. The clubhouse includes a meeting room, conference room, kitchen, six offices, a players locker room with showers, a trainer/therapy room, a hydrotherapy room, laundry room, an umpire locker room, coaches locker room, and an expanded weight training room that was added in 2004–05.

Red Sox departure
The Red Sox had a lease with Fort Myers for City of Palms Park through 2019, however, team ownership had been considering exercising an early exit in their contract, allowing them to leave following 2009 spring training. On October 28, 2008, the Lee County commission voted 3–1 to approve an agreement with the Boston Red Sox to build a new spring training facility for the team in south Lee County. That new facility became known as "JetBlue Park", and in February 2012, the Boston Red Sox moved their spring training operations into the newly constructed JetBlue Park at Fenway South located on County Road 876 (Daniels Parkway) in Fort Myers.

Post-Red Sox usage
Lee County has owned the stadium since 2003, when the City of Fort Myers transferred ownership due to the cost of upkeep. Since 2014, the stadium has been used by the baseball team of Florida SouthWestern State College, and it is also used for some amateur baseball games. The City of Fort Myers occasionally uses the venue for concerts.

In addition to City of Palms Park and JetBlue Park, there are two other spring training facilities in Fort Myers. The Minnesota Twins train in Hammond Stadium on the southern end of Fort Myers. Terry Park Ballfield (also known as the Park T. Pigott Memorial Stadium) in East Fort Myers is the former spring training home of the Philadelphia Athletics, Cleveland Indians, Pittsburgh Pirates and Kansas City Royals.  Terry Park has not been used for spring training since 1987.

Possible demolition
The cost to maintain the ballpark each year is $500,000, yet the facility only creates $32,000 in revenue annually. In the fall of 2019, Lee County officials received a request from the City of Fort Myers to demolish the stadium, so the land could be given back to the city for use in a redevelopment project.

References

Boston Red Sox spring training venues
Buildings and structures in Fort Myers, Florida
Grapefruit League venues
Tourist attractions in Fort Myers, Florida
Sports venues in Fort Myers, Florida
1993 establishments in Florida
Sports venues completed in 1993